Lipoatrophic diabetes is a type of diabetes mellitus presenting with severe lipodystrophy in addition to the traditional signs of diabetes.

See also
 Familial partial lipodystrophy
 Congenital generalized lipodystrophy

External links 

 
 
 

Diabetes